Alma Dale Campbell Brown (born June 14, 1968) is the head of global media partnerships at [Meta] and a former American television news reporter and anchorwoman. She served as co-anchor of the NBC news program Weekend Today from 2003 to 2007, and hosted the series Campbell Brown on CNN from 2008 to 2010. Brown won an Emmy Award as part of the NBC team reporting on Hurricane Katrina. Since 2013 she has been an education reform and school choice activist.

Early life and family
Campbell Brown was born Alma Dale Campbell Brown in Ferriday, Louisiana, the daughter of the former Louisiana Democratic State Senator and Secretary of State James H. Brown Jr., and Brown's first wife, Dale Campbell. Alma Dale was her maternal grandmother's name. Her parents divorced when she was young.

Brown was raised as a Roman Catholic, though her father is a Presbyterian. She has two sisters.

Brown grew up in Ferriday, Louisiana, and attended the Trinity Episcopal Day School. Her family was involved in hunting, politics, and cooking, "It was all about Cajun and tight-knit families and big parties," according to Brown.

She was expelled from the Madeira School for sneaking off campus to go to a party. Brown attended Louisiana State University for two years before graduating from Regis University. After graduation, she spent a year teaching English in Czechoslovakia. A 2003 New York Times article described her as "a tattooed former party girl and beach bum".

Journalism career

She began her career in local news reporting for KSNT-TV, the NBC affiliate in Topeka, Kansas, and then for WWBT-TV, the NBC affiliate in Richmond, Virginia, and also reported for WBAL-TV in Baltimore, Maryland, and WRC-TV in Washington, D.C. Brown joined NBC News in 1996. She was later assigned to The Pentagon and covered the war in Kosovo. Before Weekend Today, she was the White House correspondent for NBC News.

Presidential election coverage in 2000
During the 2000 U.S. presidential election, she covered George W. Bush, the Republican National Convention, and Republican party primary elections. She became the main substitute anchor for Brian Williams on the NBC Nightly News.

In March 2006, Brown was named as one of five women who might replace Katie Couric when she left the Today Show. The position went to Meredith Vieira.

Move to CNN

Brown announced July 22, 2007, on Weekend Today, that she would be leaving NBC News after eleven years to devote time to her family and expected baby. CNN confirmed it had hired Brown, and that Brown would start work for CNN in February 2008 (originally November 2007), filling the spot previously held by Paula Zahn, who left the network. Brown began anchoring CNN Election Center, which ran from February through October 2008. The show was renamed Campbell Brown: No Bias, No Bull in October 2008, shortly before the election in order to ensure a smooth transition when the election was over. Roland Martin filled in as guest host in April and May 2009 while Brown took maternity leave; when she returned in June 2009, the show was again renamed this time simply to Campbell Brown.

Departure

In the face of low ratings, CNN released Brown from her contract. On May 18, 2010, Brown announced that she would be leaving CNN. She later told the Los Angeles Times that she had originally hoped that a straight news program like hers could compete successfully against the opinion-driven shows of her competitors, Bill O'Reilly and Keith Olbermann. Olbermann responded by naming Brown as a runner-up in his daily "Worst Person In The World" segment.

Brown's last day at CNN was on July 21, 2010. Beginning on July 22, her 8:00 p.m. prime time slot was filled by a second hour of Rick Sanchez's Rick's List TV program.

Post-CNN journalism
After leaving CNN, Brown began writing opinion pieces for publications that included The New York Times, The Wall Street Journal, The Daily Beast and Slate. Weekly Standard editor Bill Kristol proposed that Brown run for Charles Schumer's Senate seat.

In January 2017, Facebook announced that Brown would be joining to lead the company's news partnerships team. Her title is head of global news partnerships. In 2018, The Australian newspaper reported that Brown, in a private meeting with Facebook publishing partners, told the partners that their business models would die in a hospice unless they worked with Facebook.

In May, Brown was named Head of all of media partnerships at Meta. 
In the new role, Brown oversees Entertainment, Sports and News across all Meta platforms. Her team manages broadcasters, streamers, film studios, digital publishers, news publishers, sports teams and leagues. Brown also oversees a global team that works with governments and policymakers on new regulations for on-platform content; and manages Meta’s partnerships with fact-checkers globally working to reduce misinformation on the platform.

Political activism
Brown has become an outspoken advocate for school choice and "education reform". In June 2013, Brown founded the Parents Transparency Project, a nonprofit watchdog group on behalf of parents seeking information and accountability from the teachers' unions and New York Department of Education on actions impacting children in schools. The group, working with the New York Daily News, investigated and reported on school employees who were accused of sexual misconduct with children but still kept their jobs.

In a January 2014 op-ed, Brown criticized teachers' unions for failing to support a bill before Congress that would require more stringent background checks for teachers. Noting that 97 tenured New York City teachers or school employees had been charged with sexual misconduct during the previous five years, she complained that while ordinary employers would exhibit zero tolerance toward such offenders, New York law required an elaborate, expensive process that involves the participation of the teachers' unions, which "prefer suspensions and fines, and not dismissal, for teachers charged with inappropriate sexual conduct." United Federation of Teachers vice president Leo Carey disputed Brown's account of this process and its outcome, but Mayor Michael Bloomberg agreed with Brown, saying that "maybe if you were a serial ax murderer, you might get a slap on the wrist."

In April 2014, Brown launched the website CommonSenseContract.com, to influence New York City's contract talks with the United Federation of Teachers. Brown stated, "We want the Department of Education and the United Federation of Teachers to consider the views of parents."

Brown has also focused on reforming teacher tenure policies through the judicial system. She wrote a number of op-eds voicing her support for the successful Vergara v. California case in 2014, which overturned California's teacher tenure, dismissal, and seniority policies. Brown called Vergara "the most important case you've never heard of", and praised the plaintiffs' efforts, saying they were "[taking] aim at laws that go directly to the heart of a good education: the ability to have, keep, and respect good teachers and dismiss utterly failing ones." She celebrated Vergara as "A historic victory for America's kids" and previewed the national ramifications of the ruling, saying, "It would be no surprise to see parents in New York and elsewhere take the cue of the Vergara plaintiffs and take matters into their own hands."

Partnership for Educational Justice
In June 2014, Brown founded the non-profit organization Partnership for Educational Justice.

In its first major endeavor, Brown's group helped nine New York families organize and file a lawsuit against New York state, challenging the state's teacher tenure, teacher dismissal, and "Last In, First Out" seniority statutes. In Wright v. New York, filed in New York City on July 28, 2014, the plaintiffs claim that these teacher tenure, dismissal, and seniority policies violated their children's state constitutional right to a "sound basic education".  Brown said she hoped that taking the issue of teacher tenure reform to the courts would "force a new legislative process" around New York's tenure policies.

In September 2014, the case was consolidated with another lawsuit challenging New York tenure laws, and now is in litigation as Davids v. New York. The case is ongoing.

In May 2016, the Partnership for Educational Justice became involved in a lawsuit against Minnesota Education Commissioner Brenda Cassellius, Governor Mark Dayton, the Minnesota Department of Education and the state of Minnesota, stemming from a teacher tenure dispute in the Anoka-Hennepin School District which claims in part that Minnesota's Continuing Contract Law and Tenure Act, in particular its "last in, first out" layoff rules, is unconstitutional on the grounds that it denies students a "'uniform' and 'thorough' education".

The 74
In July 2015, Brown co-founded The 74, a non-profit, news site covering education in America; it gets its name from the fact that there are roughly 74 million children under the age of 18 in the United States. The 74 receives funding from a variety of charter school advocacy groups including the Walton Family Foundation, the Doris & Donald Fisher Fund and Bloomberg Philanthropies. According to a report in the Los Angeles Times, critics accuse The 74 of being pro-charter schools and anti-union.

Facebook

In 2017 she was made the head of global news partnerships at Facebook.
https://www.axios.com/2022/05/19/campbell-brown-meta-new-media-partnerships-team

Other memberships
Brown also serves on the boards of Success Academy Charter Schools, a New York City charter school network; Turnaround for Children, a nonprofit organization that addresses the emotional effects of poverty on children's learning environments; and the International Women's Media Foundation (IWMF).

Personal life
A 2003 New York Times article mentioned that Brown was a smoker at the time of its writing.

On April 2, 2006, Brown married Daniel Samuel Senor, the former chief spokesperson for the Coalition Provisional Authority in Iraq. They had met in Iraq in March 2004, when Senor was spokesman for the Coalition Provisional Authority in Baghdad and Brown was one of the journalists covering his daily news conferences. After Senor returned to Washington in 2004, Brown called him. "I was wildly, wildly curious about his experience in Iraq," she later said. According to The New York Times, "their first date was a group dinner, with Tom Brokaw and another journalist." Senor and Brown married at the Beaver Creek Chapel in Beaver Creek, Colorado. Brown converted to Judaism, her husband's faith. Brown's earlier marriage, to a Washington, D.C. real estate broker, had ended in divorce after two years.

On June 24, 2007, Brown announced on Weekend Today that she and her husband were expecting their first baby. On December 18, 2007, Brown gave birth to their son, Eli James Senor, named after his grandfather, James Senor.

In an August 2008 article, Brown addressed charges that her marriage to Senor, who at the time was working as an advisor for the Mitt Romney presidential campaign, represented a conflict of interest for her as a journalist. Brown noted that such marriages were commonplace in Washington, with NBC reporters Chuck Todd and Andrea Mitchell married to a Democratic consultant and Alan Greenspan, respectively.

On October 27, 2008, during a guest appearance on The Daily Show, Brown announced her second pregnancy. On April 6, 2009, Brown gave birth to her second son, Asher Liam Senor.

In popular culture
In 2012, Brown performed as a "broadcast journalist" in the play 8.

Brown was portrayed by the actress and comedian Tracey Ullman in her Showtime comedy series Tracey Ullman's State of the Union, and by Kristen Wiig on Saturday Night Live.

References

External links 

 Campbell Brown Today Show profile
 
 
 
 TVNewser confirmation of move to CNN

1968 births
Living people
American broadcast news analysts
American expatriates in Czechoslovakia
20th-century American Jews
American television reporters and correspondents
Converts to Judaism from Roman Catholicism
News & Documentary Emmy Award winners
People from Ferriday, Louisiana
Regis University alumni
American women television journalists
CNN people
NBC News people
Madeira School alumni
21st-century American Jews
20th-century American women
21st-century American women